The Journal of the Gay and Lesbian Medical Association was a peer-reviewed medical journal devoted to the healthcare needs of LGBT people. The journal published a variety of clinical research, review articles, and essays. It was the official journal of the Gay and Lesbian Medical Association. Vincent Silenzio served as co-editor in chief. Publication of the journal ceased in 2002.

References

External links 
 
 Gay and Lesbian Medical Association Homepage

Quarterly journals
Springer Science+Business Media academic journals
Publications established in 1997
Publications disestablished in 2002
Public health journals
English-language journals
LGBT-related journals